Darcy Fogarty (born 25 September 1999) is a professional Australian rules footballer playing for the Adelaide Football Club in the Australian Football League (AFL). 

Fogarty grew up at Lucindale in the southeast of South Australia. He was drafted by Adelaide with its first selection and twelfth overall in the 2017 national draft.

References

External links

1999 births
Living people
Adelaide Football Club players
Dandenong Stingrays players
Australian rules footballers from South Australia
People from Lucindale, South Australia